Kurt Seyit ve Şura is Turkish television drama based on a novel of the same name in a series. (It is not a direct adaptation of Kurt Seyt ve Murka, which is the second novel in the series, nor of Shura, which is the third novel.) It was broadcast on Star TV from 4 March to 20 November 2014 for two seasons and 22 episodes.  Nermin Bezmen, the writer of the novel is the granddaughter of Kurt Seyit. The show "Kurt Seyit ve Sura" is based on a true story where a handsome army major falls in love with a Russian girl.

This show re-aired on E extra in 2022

Plot 
"Kurt Seyit ve Şura" is about the adventures of two people in love who are forced to leave their lives and family behind and escape to Istanbul during the Russian Revolution. The journey of Kurt Seyit Eminof (Kıvanç Tatlıtuğ), a handsome lieutenant from Crimea, and Şura (Farah Zeynep Abdullah), the beautiful daughter of a noble Russian family, tells their tale from the days of magnificence in Petrograd, to the Carpathian front line, from the riots to the revolution, from bucolic Alushta to occupied Istanbul, to Pera in the 1920s. It is the journey of their love.

Cast

Episodes

References

External links 
  
 

2014 Turkish television series debuts
2014 Turkish television series endings
Turkish drama television series
Star TV (Turkey) original programming
Television series produced in Istanbul
Television shows set in Istanbul